Alexander Hamilton McGuffey (August 13, 1816 – June 3, 1896) was an editor of the fifth and sixth of the series of McGuffey Readers. His brother William Holmes McGuffey edited the first four readers in the series. Alexander McGuffey began his career as an educator, before becoming a lawyer. He was secretary and treasurer of the Trustees of Cincinnati College, responsible for pulling the institution out of debt after poor financial practices and two significant fires.

Early life and education

Alexander Hamilton McGuffy was born in Trumbull County, Ohio on August 13, 1816. His parents were intellectual, refined Scottish people. When he was nine or ten years old, he was placed under the care of his twenty-six year old brother William Holmes McGuffey. He lived at his brother's house in Oxford, Ohio, where he studied Hebrew. At the age of sixteen, he graduated from Miami University, attending the school from 1826 to 1831.

Career
He taught Stanley Matthews and his siblings and boarded at the Matthews home, which was near the house of Dr. Lyman Beecher. McGuffey was friends with Harriet Beecher Stowe.

He was hired by Woodward College in Cincinnati to be a professor of Belles-lettres. Within a few years he became the chair of the Ancient Languages department at Woodward. His brother William was also a professor at Woodland College.

He chose to become a lawyer and was admitted to the Cincinnati bar when he was twenty-one years of age. His office was near that of Salmon P. Chase. He entered into a law partnership with his son-in-law Henry Albert Morrill in 1869. Morrill married Anna McGuffey in 1867.

Winthrop B. Smith planned to publish a series of elementary English text books, known as the McGuffey Readers. They were written by the McGuffey brothers, William and Alexander. William wrote the first four readers, and was believed to have had assistance from Alexander McGuffey, who wrote the Fifth and Sixth Reader. He entered into a contract with W. B. Smith on September 30, 1841 to create a rhetorical reading book. The McGuffey’s Rhetorical Guide or Fifth Reader of the Eclectic Series was published in 1844.

In 1845, McGuffey became secretary and treasurer of the Trustees of Cincinnati College when the institution was in debt and had suffered fires that gutted the school building. After several years, he had eliminated the school's debt. He was then the President of the Board of Trustees of the Miami Medical College and Director of McMicken University.

Personal life
He was married to Elizabeth M. Drake, the daughter of Dr. Daniel Drake, with whom they had children. After Elizabeth's death, he married Caroline V. Rich of Buston, with whom he had three children. McGuffey lived in Cincinnati and was an Episcopalian until his death on June 4, 1896. When he died, he was survived by his wife and nine children.

Legacy

Notes

References

1816 births
1896 deaths
American non-fiction writers
American people of Scotch-Irish descent
Lawyers from Cincinnati
Writers from Cincinnati
Miami University alumni